Medribnik is a settlement in the Municipality of Cirkulane in the Haloze area of eastern Slovenia. It lies in the valley of Belica Creek south of Cirkulane towards the border with Croatia. The area traditionally belonged to the Styria region. It is now included in the Drava Statistical Region.

References

External links
Medribnik on Geopedia

Populated places in the Municipality of Cirkulane